London lore: the legends and traditions of the world's most vibrant city is a 2008 book about the folklore and history of London by Steve Roud. Another edition was published in 2010.

Background
The book presents various unique stories and traditions to come from historical London, such as Spring-heeled Jack and Pearly Kings and Queens.

Reception
In The Guardian Nicholas Lezard chose the book as a favourite and wrote ' it doesn't matter if you're reading this in London, Glasgow or Smolensk: you're going to find this an enthralling book. Assuming, that is, that you are interested in superstitions, magic, legends, history and the endless parade of human credulity'. Londonist described the book as 'an excellent tome', while in the London Evening Standard Will Self wrote that he had been 'enthralled' by it. The book was also praised by the historian Peter Ackroyd, in the Camden New Journal as 'fascinating' and 'admirably put together' and 'a spellbinding study of our city's folklore' in the Newham Recorder.

References

2008 non-fiction books
Books about London
Books about the paranormal
English-language books
History books about London
History books about the occult
Mythology books